Beginnings is the third album by Canadian pianist and composer David Braid, and the first to feature the duo he co-leads with clarinetist Phil Nimmons, Nimmons'n'Braid. It was recorded live in Dundas, Ontario in 2004. The album's track names and customizable artwork contain references to the seven notes of the musical alphabet.

Track listing 
All music created spontaneously by Phil Nimmons and David Braid

"Ayy" 9:40
"Bee" 7:24
"Cee" 8:52
"Dee" 4:10
"Eeh" 10:28
"Eff" 10:31
"Gee" 7:43

Personnel
Phil Nimmons — clarinet
David Braid — piano

Production 
 Recording: Live direct to disc
 Mastering: Andy Krehm
 Artwork: Marc Lafoy, Phil Nimmons

2005 albums
David Braid albums